Estadio Obras Sanitarias (also known as Arena Obras Sanitarias and Templo del Rock) is an indoor arena that is located in Buenos Aires, Argentina. The arena, home venue of club Obras Sanitarias, is mainly used to host basketball games and concerts. It has a capacity of 3,100 people for basketball games, and 4,700 people for concerts.

History 
Estadio Obras Sanitarias was opened in June 1978. Over the years, the arena has been one of two home venues often used by the sports club Obras Sanitarias, with the other being the Polideportivo Municipal de San Rafael.

The arena has hosted the FIBA Intercontinental Cup tournament four times. It hosted the FIBA Intercontinental Cup's 1978 edition, the 1983 edition, in which the local club Obras Sanitarias won the title, the 1986 edition, in which Žalgiris Kaunas won the title, and also the 2021 edition.

During its history, the arena has also hosted numerous musical concerts, particularly rock concerts, which has led to the arena being given the nickname of "Templo del Rock" ("Temple of Rock"). From 2006 to 2012, the arena had the name sponsorship of Estadio Pepsi Music (Pepsi Music Stadium), as part of a multinational marketing campaign of the Pepsi company, which sponsored rock festivals and concerts at the arena.

Concerts held

Live albums
Some of the live albums and DVDs recorded at this stadium include:

Megadeth - That One Night: Live in Buenos Aires
KISS - Live...Buenos Aires '94
Attaque 77 - Trapos
Bersuit Vergarabat - De la Cabeza
Almafuerte - En Vivo Obras 2001
La Renga - Bailando en una pata
Hermética - Lo último
Serú Girán - No llores por mí, Argentina

References

External links

 

1978 establishments in Argentina
Basketball venues in Argentina
Indoor arenas in Argentina
Music venues completed in 1978
Music venues in Argentina
Sports venues completed in 1978
Sports venues in Buenos Aires